Filopaludina is a genus of freshwater snails with a gill and an operculum, aquatic gastropod mollusks in the family Viviparidae.

Distribution 
The indigenous distribution of Filopaludina includes Southeast Asia.

Species
Species within the genus Filopaludina are within two subgenera and they include:

subgenus Siamopaludina Brandt, 1968
 Filopaludina javanica (von dem Busch, 1844)
 Filopaludina maekoki (Brandt, 1968)
 Filopaludina martensi (Frauenfeld, 1865)
 Filopaludina martensi cambodiensis Brandt, 1974
 Filopaludina martensi martensi (Frauenfeld, 1865)
 Filopaludina martensi munensis Brandt, 1974

subgenus Filopaludina Habe, 1964
 Filopaludina filosa (Reeve, 1863)
 Filopaludina miveruensis Smith
 Filopaludina sumatrensis (Dunker, 1852)
 Filopaludina sumatrensis peninsularis Brandt, 1974

subgenus ?
 Filopaludina bengalensis (Lamarck, 1818)
 Filopaludina munensis

Synonyms:
 Filopaludina doliaris (Gould, 1844) is a synonym of Idiopoma doliaris (Gould, 1844)
 Filopaludina mandahlbarthi is a synonym of Sinotaia mandahlbarthi Brandt, 1968
 Filopaludina quadrata (Benson, 1842) is a synonym of Sinotaia quadrata (Benson, 1842)
 Filopaludina simonis Bavay, 1898 is a synonym of Idiopoma simonis Bavay, 1898

Ecology 
Filopaludina sp. from Vietnam serves as a second intermediate host for the parasitic fluke Echinostoma revolutum.

References

 Brandt R.A.M. (1974). The non-marine aquatic Mollusca of Thailand. Archiv für Molluskenkunde. 105: i-iv, 1-423

External links 

Viviparidae